Trustmark may refer to:

 Trustmark (bank), headquartered in Mississippi
 - Trustmark Park, a ballpark in Pearl, Mississippi
 - RSA Trustmark Building, in Mobile, Alabama
 Trustmark (benefits company), headquartered in Illinois
 Trustmark (commerce), business term